Sowle is a surname. Notable people with the surname include:

 Diana Sowle (1930–2018), American actress
 Jennifer Sowle (born 1977), American singer
 Melvin L. Sowle, eponym of Sowle Nunatak in Antarctica